Kharga  Basnet (born 28 February 1956), also known as Khare Basnet is a Bhutanese football manager and former player who coached the Bhutan national team and became the general secretary of the federation.

Career 
His career began in Bhutan - included various positions in the Bhutan Football Federation, among others, was the general secretary of the federation.

He coached Bhutan national team until 2008.

Basnet has retired from Bhutan Football Federation.

Career statistics

References

External links
 Profile at Soccerway.com
 Profile at Soccerpunter.com

1956 births
Living people
Bhutanese people of Nepalese descent
Bhutanese footballers
Bhutan international footballers
Bhutanese football managers
Bhutan national football team managers
Place of birth missing (living people)
Association footballers not categorized by position